The 1935 The Citadel Bulldogs football team represented The Citadel, The Military College of South Carolina in the 1935 college football season.  Tatum Gressette served as head coach for the fourth season.  The Bulldogs played as members of the Southern Intercollegiate Athletic Association and played home games at Johnson Hagood Stadium.

Schedule

References

Citadel
The Citadel Bulldogs football seasons
Citadel Bulldogs football